Frank Gustav Bell (1863 – April 14, 1891) was an American Major League Baseball player from Cincinnati who played one season in the Majors, for the  Brooklyn Grays of the American Association. In July 1885 Bell appeared in a total of ten games as a catcher, outfielder, and third baseman for the Grays. He batted .172 (5-for-29) with two runs batted in and five runs scored.

He was a brother of former major league pitcher Charlie Bell.  After his baseball career, Bell became a private police officer. On April 14, 1891, he was shot and killed by a bartender in a saloon following a card game called Freeze-Out.   He is interred at Wesleyan Cemetery.

References

External links

Encyclopedia of Baseball Catchers

1863 births
1891 deaths
Major League Baseball catchers
Major League Baseball outfielders
American murder victims
19th-century baseball players
Brooklyn Grays players
People murdered in Ohio
Deaths by firearm in Ohio
Grand Rapids (minor league baseball) players
Memphis Reds players
Baseball players from Cincinnati
Burials at Wesleyan Cemetery, Cincinnati
American police officers killed in the line of duty
 1891 murders in the United States